is the 28th single by Japanese pop duo Puffy AmiYumi, released on July 29, 2009. "Dareka ga" was used as the official theme song for the sixth Naruto movie, Inheritors of the Will of Fire.

A limited edition of the single was released along with the regular edition. The limited edition features an extra DVD with exclusive footage of the movie including the trailer.

Track listing

CD single
Dareka ga
Wedding Bell [80kidz remix]

Chart performance
The single peaked at number 30 on the singles chart and stayed on the chart for 4 weeks.

References

2009 singles
2009 songs
Puffy AmiYumi songs
Ki/oon Music singles
Japanese film songs
Naruto songs
Songs written for animated films
Song articles with missing songwriters